The Coal River runs from southern Yukon, Canada, into northern British Columbia, Canada, where it flows into the Liard River at historic milepost 533 of the Alaska Highway (Highway 97). It was originally named Charles River in 1831, after John Charles of the Hudson's Bay Company. When Canadian explorer-geologist Richard George McConnell visited the river in 1887, he noted deposits of low grade lignite that had been brought down by the river.

This river hosts a series of class 5 and 6 rapids, but the start of the river is not accessible by road—only the bottom end can be reached by an automobile. Where the Coal River runs into the Liard river stands the Coal River Lodge, which contains an RV park, motel, cafe, gas station,  airstrip, and gift shop. The "community" of Coal River has a winter population of 2, and in the summer swells to 5 or 6 when the lodge is open.

See also
List of rivers of Yukon

References

Rivers of Yukon
Rivers of British Columbia
Tributaries of the Liard River